Anna Radziwiłłówna Kiszczyna Sadowska (died 1600), was a Polish magnate, reformer and writer.

She was the daughter of Jan Radziwiłł and Anna Kostewiczówna and married to Stanisław Kiszka (d. 1554) in 1552 and Kristopher Sadowski in 1574. She was a Calvinist who introduced the Protestant Reformation in her lands. In, 1563, she became a follower and supporter of the Polish Brethren. She wrote several religious works.

References

 Janusz Kostewicz, Polski Słownik Biograficzny, t.14, s.343-4

1600 deaths
16th-century Polish women
Protestant Reformers
16th-century Polish writers
16th-century Polish women writers
Radziwiłł family
16th-century Polish landowners
16th-century women landowners